The Virginia Employment Commission (VEC) is a division of the Virginia state government that provides benefits and services to unemployed citizens.

References

Government of Virginia